Véronique Pierron (born 22 July 1989 in Sedan) is a French short-track speed-skater.

Pierron competed at the 2010 Winter Olympics for France. She finished second in the first round of the 500 metres, advancing to the quarterfinals, where she finished fourth, failing to advance. She placed 14th overall.

As of 2013, Pierron's best finish at the World Championships is 6th, in the 1500 metres in 2012.

As of 2013, Pierron has not finished on the podium on the ISU Short Track Speed Skating World Cup. Her top World Cup ranking is 9th, in the 1000 metres in 2011–12.

References 

1989 births
Living people
French female short track speed skaters
Olympic short track speed skaters of France
Short track speed skaters at the 2010 Winter Olympics
Short track speed skaters at the 2014 Winter Olympics
Short track speed skaters at the 2018 Winter Olympics
People from Sedan, Ardennes
Université Savoie-Mont Blanc alumni
Sportspeople from Ardennes (department)
21st-century French women